The 2017–18 network television schedule for the five major English-language commercial broadcast networks in the United States covers prime time hours from September 2017 to August 2018. The schedule is followed by a list per network of returning series, new series, and series canceled after the 2016–17 season.

NBC was the first to announce its fall schedule, on May 14, 2017, followed by Fox on May 15, ABC on May 16, CBS on May 17, and The CW on May 18, 2017. NBC adjusted its schedule on May 30, 2017.

PBS is not included; member television stations have local flexibility over most of their schedules and broadcast times for network shows may vary. Ion Television and MyNetworkTV are also not included since both networks' schedules consist of syndicated reruns (with limited original programming on the former). The CW does not air network programming on weekend nights. However, they would return to programming a two-hour Sunday night schedule the following season.

New series are highlighted in bold.

All times are U.S. Eastern and Pacific Time (except for some live sports or events). Subtract one hour for Central, Mountain, Alaska, and Hawaii-Aleutian times.

Note: From February 7 to February 25, 2018, all NBC primetime programming was pre-empted for coverage of the 2018 Winter Olympics in Pyeongchang, South Korea.

Each of the 30 highest-rated shows is listed with its rank and rating as determined by Nielsen Media Research.

Legend

Sunday

Monday

Tuesday

Wednesday

Thursday

Notes
On both CBS and NBC, Thursday Night Kickoff and Football Night in... started at 7:30 p.m. ET out of primetime depending on the network carrying the game, preempting local programming. NBC's scheduling for the NFL's Kickoff Game and Thanksgiving night game was under the different Sunday Night Football package and game coverage filled the entirety of primetime.

Friday

Saturday

Notes
NBC carried primetime coverage of Notre Dame college football on September 9 and October 21, along with a special Sunday Night Football game on December, a January 2018 NFL Wild Card, the NHL Stadium Series on March 3, the first, second and third round NHL playoff games in April and late May and the 2018 Coke Zero Sugar 400 on July 7, while CBS carried one SEC college football game in November, and the NCAA men's basketball tournament in late March and Fox carried five Ultimate Fighting Championship fights on December 16, January 27, February 24, April 14 and July 28, and the 2018 Toyota Owners 400 on April 21.
NBC's Pacific and Mountain Time Zone affiliates carry new episodes of Saturday Night Live in real time with the rest of the United States, placing its airtime within the prime time period throughout this season (except for the February 3 episode due to the commitments to carry the 7th Annual NFL Honors); a re-air is broadcast after the late local news in those time zones. The network's affiliates in Alaska, Hawaii and other Pacific islands carry the show on delay as usual.

By network

ABC

Returning series:
20/20
The $100,000 Pyramid
Agents of S.H.I.E.L.D.
America's Funniest Home Videos
American Housewife
American Idol
The Bachelor
Bachelor in Paradise
The Bachelorette
Black-ish
Celebrity Family Feud
Dancing with the Stars
Designated Survivor
Fresh Off the Boat
The Goldbergs
The Gong Show
The Great American Baking Show
The Great Christmas Light Fight
Grey's Anatomy
How to Get Away with Murder
Match Game
The Middle
Modern Family
NBA Saturday Primetime
Once Upon a Time
Quantico
Roseanne
Saturday Night Football
Scandal
Shark Tank
Speechless
To Tell the Truth
The Toy Box
What Would You Do?

New series:
Alex, Inc. *
The Bachelor Winter Games *
Castaways *
Child Support *
The Crossing *
Deception *
For the People *
The Good Doctor
Inhumans
Kevin (Probably) Saves the World
The Last Defense *
The Mayor
The Proposal *
Splitting Up Together *
Station 19 *
Take Two *
Ten Days in the Valley

Not returning from 2016–17:
20/20: In an Instant
ABC Saturday Movie of the Week
American Crime
Big Fan
Boy Band
The Catch
Conviction
Downward Dog
Dr. Ken
Imaginary Mary
Last Man Standing (moved to Fox in 2018–19)
Notorious
The Real O'Neals
Secrets and Lies
Somewhere Between
Steve Harvey's Funderdome
Time After Time
When We Rise

CBS

Returning series:
48 Hours
48 Hours: NCIS
60 Minutes
The Amazing Race
The Big Bang Theory
Big Brother
Blue Bloods
Bull
Code Black
Criminal Minds
Elementary
Hawaii Five-0 
Kevin Can Wait
Life in Pieces
MacGyver
Madam Secretary
Man with a Plan
Mom
NCIS
NCIS: Los Angeles
NCIS: New Orleans
Ransom 
Salvation
Scorpion
Superior Donuts
Survivor
Thursday Night Football

New series:
9JKL
Celebrity Big Brother *
Instinct *
Living Biblically *
Me, Myself & I
Pink Collar Crimes *
SEAL Team
S.W.A.T.
TKO: Total Knock Out *
Whistleblower *
Wisdom of the Crowd
Young Sheldon

Not returning from 2016–17:
2 Broke Girls
Candy Crush
Criminal Minds: Beyond Borders
Doubt
The Great Indoors
Hunted
The Odd Couple
Pure Genius
Training Day
Undercover Boss (returned for 2019–20)
Zoo

The CW

Returning series:
 The 100
Arrow
Crazy Ex-Girlfriend
The Flash
iZombie
Jane the Virgin
Legends of Tomorrow
Masters of Illusion
My Last Days
The Originals
Penn & Teller: Fool Us
Riverdale
Supergirl
Supernatural
Whose Line Is It Anyway?

New series:
Black Lightning *
Burden of Truth *
Dynasty
Life Sentence *
The Outpost *
Valor

Not returning from 2016–17:
Frequency
Hooten & the Lady                                      
No Tomorrow
Reign
The Vampire Diaries

Fox

Returning series:
Beat Shazam
Bob's Burgers
Brooklyn Nine-Nine
Empire
The Exorcist
Family Guy
Fox College Football
Gotham
Hell's Kitchen
The Last Man on Earth
Lethal Weapon
Love Connection
Lucifer
MasterChef
MasterChef Junior
The Mick
New Girl
NFL on Fox
The Simpsons
So You Think You Can Dance
Star
The X-Files

New series:
9-1-1 *
The Four: Battle for Stardom *
Ghosted
The Gifted
Gordon Ramsay's 24 Hours to Hell and Back *
LA to Vegas *
One Strange Rock *
The Orville
Phenoms *
The Resident *
Showtime at the Apollo *

Not returning from 2016–17:
24: Legacy
APB
Bones
Making History
Pitch
Rosewood
Scream Queens
Shots Fired
Sleepy Hollow
Son of Zorn
You the Jury

NBC

Returning series:
American Ninja Warrior
America's Got Talent
Better Late Than Never
The Blacklist
Blindspot
Chicago Fire
Chicago Med
Chicago P.D.
Dateline NBC
Football Night in America
The Good Place
Great News
Hollywood Game Night
Law & Order: Special Victims Unit
Little Big Shots
Marlon
NBC Sunday Night Football
Running Wild with Bear Grylls
Shades of Blue
Superstore
Taken 
This Is Us 
Thursday Night Football
Timeless
Trial & Error
The Voice
The Wall
Will & Grace
World of Dance

New series:
A.P. Bio *
The Awesome Show
The Brave
Champions *
Ellen's Game of Games
Genius Junior *
Good Girls *
Law & Order True Crime
Making It *
Reverie *
Rise *

Not returning from 2016–17:
The Apprentice
The Blacklist: Redemption
The Carmichael Show
Caught on Camera with Nick Cannon
Chicago Justice
Emerald City
Grimm
Midnight, Texas (returned for 2018–19)
The Night Shift
Powerless

Renewals and cancellations

Full season pickups

ABC
The Good Doctor—Picked up for an 18-episode full season on October 3, 2017.
Kevin (Probably) Saves the World—Picked up for three additional episodes on November 10, 2017, bringing the episode count up to 16.

CBS
9JKL—Picked up for three additional episodes on November 17, 2017, bringing the episode count up to 16.
Elementary—Picked up for eight additional episodes, bringing the order to 21 episodes on November 29, 2017.
Kevin Can Wait—Picked up for an additional two episodes on December 1, 2017, bringing the episode count up to 24. 
Man with a Plan—Picked up for a 21-episode full season on November 27, 2017.
SEAL Team—Picked up for a 22-episode full season on October 12, 2017.
Superior Donuts—Picked up for a 21-episode full season on November 27, 2017.
S.W.A.T.—Picked up for a 20-episode full season on November 17, 2017, two additional episodes were ordered on December 1, 2017, bringing the episode count up to 22.
Young Sheldon—Picked up for a 22-episode full season on September 27, 2017.

The CW
Dynasty—Picked up for a 22-episode full season on November 8, 2017.

Fox
Ghosted—Picked up for six additional episodes on November 29, 2017, bringing the episode count up to 16.
LA to Vegas—Picked up for three additional episodes on January 9, 2018, bringing the episode count to 15.
The Mick—Picked up for a 20-episode full season on November 7, 2017.
Star—Picked up for an 18-episode full season on October 9, 2017.

NBC

Renewals

ABC
The $100,000 Pyramid—Renewed for a fourth season on August 7, 2018.
Agents of S.H.I.E.L.D.—Renewed for a sixth season on May 14, 2018.
America's Funniest Home Videos—Renewed for a twenty-ninth season on March 13, 2018.
American Housewife—Renewed for a third season on May 11, 2018. 
American Idol—Renewed for a seventeenth season on May 4, 2018.
The Bachelor—Renewed for a twenty-third season on March 13, 2018.
Black-ish—Renewed for a fifth season May 11, 2018.
Celebrity Family Feud—Renewed for a sixth season on August 7, 2018.
Child Support—Renewed for a second season on March 13, 2018.
Dancing with the Stars—Renewed for a twenty-seventh season on March 13, 2018.
For the People—Renewed for a second season on May 11, 2018.
Fresh Off the Boat—Renewed for a fifth season on May 11, 2018.  
The Goldbergs—Renewed for a sixth season on May 11, 2017.
The Good Doctor—Renewed for a second season on March 7, 2018.
The Great American Baking Show—On May 4, 2018, the show was renewed for a fourth season to premiere later that year.
The Great Christmas Light Fight—During the season five finale it was announced that the show was renewed for a sixth season, set to air in 2018.
Grey's Anatomy —Renewed for a fifteenth season on April 20, 2018.
How to Get Away with Murder—Renewed for a fifth season on May 11, 2018. 
Modern Family—Renewed for a tenth season on May 10, 2017.
Shark Tank—Renewed for a tenth season on January 8, 2018.
Speechless—Renewed for a third season on May 11, 2018.
Splitting Up Together—Renewed for a second season on May 11, 2018.
Station 19—Renewed for a second season on May 11, 2018.
To Tell the Truth—Renewed for a fourth season on August 7, 2018.

CBS

48 Hours—Renewed for a thirty-first season on April 18, 2018.
60 Minutes—Renewed for a fifty-first season on April 18, 2018.
The Amazing Race—Renewed for a thirty-first season on April 18, 2018.
The Big Bang Theory—Renewed for a twelfth and final season on March 20, 2017.
Blue Bloods—Renewed for a ninth season on April 18, 2018.
Bull—Renewed for a third season on April 18, 2018.
Celebrity Big Brother—Renewed for a second season on May 12, 2018.
Criminal Minds—Renewed for a fourteenth season on May 12, 2018.
Elementary—Renewed for a seventh and final season on May 12, 2018.
Hawaii Five-0—Renewed for a ninth season on April 18, 2018.
Instinct—Renewed for a second season on May 12, 2018.
Life in Pieces—Renewed for a fourth season on May 12, 2018.
MacGyver—Renewed for a third season on April 18, 2018.
Madam Secretary—Renewed for a fifth season on April 18, 2018.
Man with a Plan—Renewed for a third season on May 12, 2018.
Mom—Renewed for a sixth season on April 8, 2018.
NCIS—Renewed for a sixteenth season on April 13, 2018.
NCIS: Los Angeles—Renewed for a tenth season on April 18, 2018.
NCIS: New Orleans—Renewed for a fifth season on April 18, 2018.
Ransom—Renewed for a third season on July 16, 2018.
SEAL Team—Renewed for a second season on March 27, 2018.
Survivor—Renewed for a thirty-seventh season on April 18, 2018.
S.W.A.T.—Renewed for a second season on March 27, 2018.
Young Sheldon—Renewed for a second season on January 6, 2018.

The CW
 The 100—Renewed for a sixth season on May 7, 2018.
 Arrow—Renewed for a seventh season on April 2, 2018.
 Black Lightning—Renewed for a second season on April 2, 2018.
 Burden of Truth—Renewed for a second season on October 9, 2018.
 Crazy Ex-Girlfriend—Renewed for a fourth and final season on April 2, 2018.
 Dynasty—Renewed for a second season on April 2, 2018.
 The Flash—Renewed for a fifth season on April 2, 2018.
iZombie—Renewed for a fifth and final season on May 11, 2018.
 Jane the Virgin—Renewed for a fifth and final season on April 2, 2018.
 Legends of Tomorrow—Renewed for a fourth season on April 2, 2018.
 Masters of Illusion—Renewed for an eighth season on October 9, 2018.
 The Outpost—Renewed for a second season on October 9, 2018.
 Penn & Teller: Fool Us—Renewed for a sixth season on October 9, 2018.
 Riverdale—Renewed for a third season on April 2, 2018.
 Supergirl—Renewed for a fourth season on April 2, 2018.
 Supernatural—Renewed for a fourteenth season on April 2, 2018.
 Whose Line Is It Anyway?—Renewed for a fifteenth season on October 9, 2018.

Fox
9-1-1—Renewed for a second season on January 16, 2018.
Beat Shazam—Renewed for a third season on August 21, 2018.
Bob's Burgers—Renewed for a ninth season on May 12, 2018.
Empire—Renewed for a fifth season on May 2, 2018.
Family Guy—Renewed for a seventeenth season on May 12, 2018.
The Gifted—Renewed for a second season on January 4, 2018.
Gordon Ramsay's 24 Hours to Hell and Back—Renewed for a second season on June 27, 2018.
Gotham—Renewed for a fifth and final season on May 13, 2018.
Lethal Weapon—Renewed for a third season on May 13, 2018, which five days after the firing of co-star Clayne Crawford.
MasterChef—Renewed for a tenth season on September 20, 2018.
The Orville—Renewed for a second season on November 2, 2017.
The Resident—Renewed for a second season on May 7, 2018.
The Simpsons—Renewed for a thirtieth season on November 4, 2016.
Star—Renewed for a third season on May 10, 2018.

NBC
American Ninja Warrior—Renewed for an eleventh season on February 14, 2019.
A.P. Bio—Renewed for a second season on May 8, 2018.
The Blacklist—Renewed for a sixth season on May 12, 2018.
Blindspot—Renewed for a fourth season on May 10, 2018.
Chicago Fire—Renewed for a seventh season on May 9, 2018.
Chicago Med—Renewed for a fourth season on May 9, 2018.
Chicago P.D.—Renewed for a sixth season on May 9, 2018.
Ellen's Game of Games—Renewed for a second season on January 9, 2018.
Football Night in America—Renewed for a thirteenth season on December 14, 2011.
Good Girls—Renewed for a second season on May 7, 2018.
The Good Place—Renewed for a third season on November 21, 2017.
Law & Order: Special Victims Unit—Renewed for a twentieth season on May 9, 2018.
Making It—Renewed for a second season on August 21, 2018.
Midnight, Texas—Renewed for a second season on February 14, 2018.
NBC Sunday Night Football—Renewed for a thirteenth season on December 14, 2011.
Superstore—Renewed for a fourth season on February 21, 2018.
This Is Us—Renewed for a third season on January 18, 2017.
The Voice—Renewed for a fifteenth season on May 10, 2018.
The Wall—Renewed for a third season on March 12, 2018.
Will & Grace—Renewed for a tenth season on August 3, 2017 and for an eleventh season on March 17, 2018.
World of Dance—Renewed for a third season on May 10, 2018.

Cancellations/series endings

ABC
Alex, Inc.—Canceled on May 11, 2018. The series concluded on May 16, 2018.
The Crossing—Canceled on May 11, 2018. The series concluded on June 9, 2018.
Deception—Canceled on May 11, 2018. The series concluded on May 27, 2018.
Designated Survivor—Canceled on May 11, 2018, after two seasons. On September 5, 2018, it was announced that Netflix would pick up the series for another season.
Inhumans—Canceled on May 11, 2018.
Kevin (Probably) Saves the World—Canceled on May 11, 2018.
The Mayor—Canceled on January 4, 2018.
The Middle—It was announced on August 2, 2017 that season nine would be the final season. The series concluded on May 22, 2018.
Once Upon a Time—It was announced on February 6, 2018 that season seven would be the final season. The series concluded on May 18, 2018.
The Proposal—Canceled on August 5, 2019.
Quantico—Canceled on May 11, 2018, after three seasons. The series concluded on August 3, 2018.
Roseanne—Originally renewed for an eleventh season on March 30, 2018. The decision was later reversed and the series canceled on May 29, 2018, following controversial comments made by Roseanne Barr on Twitter, and later she was fired from the show. In June of 2018, ABC ordered a 10-episode spin-off tentatively titled The Conners with mostly the same cast and crew, minus Barr.
Scandal—It was announced on May 10, 2017 that season seven would be the final season. The series concluded on April 19, 2018.
Take Two—Canceled on November 21, 2018.
Ten Days in the Valley—On October 26, 2017, ABC gave notice that the series would be moved from Sundays to a burn off run of its final six episodes on Saturdays after the end of the Saturday Night Football season through the holidays, rendering it a de facto cancellation.

CBS
9JKL—Canceled on May 12, 2018.
Code Black—Canceled on May 24, 2018, after three seasons. The series concluded on July 18, 2018.
Kevin Can Wait—Canceled on May 12, 2018, after two seasons.
Living Biblically—Pulled from the schedule on April 19, 2018 after eight episodes.
Me, Myself & I—Pulled from the schedule on November 1, 2017 after six episodes, making it the first official cancellation of the season.
Salvation—Canceled on November 20, 2018, after two seasons.
Scorpion—Canceled on May 12, 2018, after four seasons.
Superior Donuts—Canceled on May 12, 2018, after two seasons.
Wisdom of the Crowd—Not ordering additional episodes on November 27, 2017, ending its run after 13 episodes.

The CW
Life Sentence—Canceled on May 8, 2018. The series concluded on June 15, 2018.
The Originals—It was announced on July 20, 2017 that season five would be the final season. The series concluded on August 1, 2018.
Valor—Canceled on May 8, 2018.

Fox
Brooklyn Nine-Nine—Canceled on May 10, 2018, after five seasons. On May 11, 2018, it was announced that NBC would pick up the series for another season.
The Exorcist—Canceled on May 11, 2018, after two seasons.
Ghosted—Canceled on June 28, 2018. The series concluded on July 22, 2018.
LA to Vegas—Canceled on May 21, 2018.
The Last Man on Earth—Canceled on May 10, 2018, after four seasons.
Love Connection—Canceled on February 27, 2019, after two seasons.
Lucifer—Canceled on May 11, 2018, after three seasons. On June 15, 2018, it was announced that Netflix would pick up the series for another season.
The Mick—Canceled on May 10, 2018, after two seasons.
New Girl—It was announced on May 14, 2017 that season seven would be the final season. The series concluded on May 15, 2018.
The X-Files—Network co-chairman and CEO Gary Newman stated that the network currently has no plans for a twelfth season. This comes after star Gillian Anderson announced that the eleventh season would be her last.

NBC
Better Late Than Never—Canceled on July 16, 2018, after two seasons. 
The Brave—Canceled on May 11, 2018. 
Champions—Canceled on June 29, 2018.
Great News—Canceled on May 11, 2018, after two seasons. 
Marlon—Canceled on December 21, 2018, after two seasons.
Reverie—Canceled on November 6, 2018.
Rise—Canceled on May 11, 2018. The series concluded on May 15, 2018.
Running Wild with Bear Grylls—It was announced on February 10, 2019 that the show will move to National Geographic for season five.
Shades of Blue—It was announced on April 4, 2018, that season three would be the final season. The series concluded on August 19, 2018.
Taken—Pulled from the schedule after 11 episodes in the second season on April 18, 2018; NBC announced that the series would move from Fridays to a burn off run of three final episodes on Saturdays during the first three weeks of summer. The series was later canceled on May 11, 2018, after two seasons.
Timeless—Canceled on June 22, 2018, after two seasons. 
Trial & Error—Canceled on January 16, 2019, after two seasons.

Programming circumstances not previously noted

ABC 
The third season of The Great American Baking Show premiered on Thursday, December 7, 2017 with two episodes in one night under the expectation of carrying two more episodes on the nights of December 14 and 21, respectively to complete the six-episode season. The program was removed from the schedule on December 13, 2017 due to sexual harassment allegations against judge Johnny Iuzzini. The winner (Vallery Lomas) was announced in a short video on December 21, and ABC substituted various holiday programming in its place.

CBS and NBC to Fox 
The NFL announced on January 31, 2018 that the Thursday Night Football package would move in full to Fox for the 2018 season.

See also
2017–18 Canadian network television schedule
2017–18 United States network television schedule (daytime)
2017–18 United States network television schedule (late night)

Notes

References

2017 in American television
2018 in American television
United States primetime network television schedules